Historically, Italy had two unusual dominant track gauges which were legally defined depending on the terrain encountered.

Since the 1930s, the  gauge has been adopted as the standard and gradually replaced the  track gauge.

Historical legal definitions of 1879

Italian law has defined its track gauges in terms of the distance between the centres of each rail, rather than the inside edges of the rails, giving some unusual measurements.

The narrower gauge has 1,000 mm between the centres of the rails, which explains the name Italian metre gauge, but it is 950 mm in gauge when measured from the inside of the rails,as gauges are normally measured in other countries.

A disadvantage of measuring from the centre of the rail is that the width of the rail varies and affects the gauge. It is easier and more reliable to measure from the inner edges of the rails.

gauge railways
The following  systems survive today:
Orvieto Funicular
Milan tram network
Turin tram network
Rome tram network
Naples tram network
Outside Italy, the Madrid Metro also uses this gauge.

or standard gauge railways

The network is recently growing with the construction of the new high-speed rail network.

Italian narrow gauge railways

The aforementioned  "Italian metre gauge" was also used in the former Italian colonies of Eritrea (Eritrean Railway), Libya (Italian Libya Railways), and Somalia (Mogadishu-Villabruzzi Railway).

See also
Narrow gauge railways in Italy
List of track gauges

References

 
 
Italian railway-related lists
Italy, rail gauges
Italy